TSD Desalination (Tethys Solar Desalination) is an Israeli startup company that provides solar-powered desalination technology. Jewish Business News named TSD one of 25 cool Israeli startups to watch in 2017, and CNBC mentioned TSD alongside IDE Technologies in a review of Israeli high-tech.

TSD was founded in 2014. Their technology, developed by Joshua Altman and Prof. Moshe Tshuva at Afeka College of Engineering in Tel Aviv, uses solar energy directly to power desalination and water treatment. Ze'ev Emmerich, a founder of TSD, claims their method is scalable and environmentally friendly, as well as being cheaper than reverse osmosis.

References

External links
 Tethys Solar Desalination

Technology companies of Israel
Water desalination
Israeli companies established in 2014